Hendrina Elizabet "Els" van den Horn (later van Breda, 19 May 1927 – 27 May 1996) was a Dutch diver. She competed at the 1952 Summer Olympics in the 3 m springboard and finished in 12th place.

References

1927 births
1996 deaths
Olympic divers of the Netherlands
Divers at the 1952 Summer Olympics
Dutch female divers